Dog Hollow may refer to:

Dog Hollow (Illinois), a valley in Pope County
Dog Hollow (McDonald County, Missouri), a valley
Dog Hollow (West Virginia), a valley
Dog Hollow, Omaha a neighborhood of Omaha, Nebraska